To Kill a Priest is a 1988 drama film directed by Agnieszka Holland. The film tells a story based on the murder, under the Polish communist regime, of priest Jerzy Popiełuszko. It stars Christopher Lambert as a fictionalized version of Popiełuszko and Ed Harris as the secret police captain set to assassinate him.

Cast
Christopher Lambert as Father Alek
Ed Harris as Stefan
Joss Ackland as Colonel
Tim Roth as Feliks
Timothy Spall as Igor
Pete Postlethwaite as Josef
Cherie Lunghi as Halina
Joanne Whalley as Anna
David Suchet as Bishop
Jerome Flynn 
Vincent Grass

Discography

The CD soundtrack composed and conducted by Georges Delerue is available on Music Box Records label (website). The main theme, "Crimes of Cain", was written and performed by Joan Baez.

References

External links

1988 films
1988 drama films
American drama films
French drama films
Films scored by Georges Delerue
Films directed by Agnieszka Holland
Films set in Poland
Drama films based on actual events
Films à clef
Films about Catholic priests
Films critical of communism
English-language French films
1980s English-language films
1980s American films
1980s French films